Ed W. Clark High School is a nine-month public high school in Las Vegas, Nevada, that is part of the Clark County School District. It opened in 1965.

History 
The campus was designed by architects Zick & Sharp, and constructed by the Del E. Webb Corporation in 1965.

Magnet programs
Academy of Finance (A.O.F.)
Academy for Mathematics, Science, Arts and Technology (A.M.S.A.T.)
Teacher Education At Clark High (T.E.A.C.H.)

Notable alumni
 Paul Anderson, Nevada state assemblyman (Class of 1988) 
 Bob Beers, state senator (Class of 1977)
 Nick Bell, former professional football player (Class of 1987)
 Shirley Breeden, former member of the Nevada Senate
 Laura Dahl, fashion designer
 Brian Dallimore, former Major League Baseball player
 John Ensign, former U.S. senator (Class of 1976)
 Robert Gamez, professional golfer (Class of 1986)
 Phil Glover, professional football player (class of 1994)
 Steven Horsford, U.S. representative (Class of 1991)
 Jimmy Kimmel, talk show host and comedian (Class of 1985)
 Catherine Cortez Masto, U.S. senator (Class of 1982)
 Ron Merkerson, professional football player
 Uhunoma Osazuwa, Nigerian track and field athlete (Class of 2006)
 Ardis Parshall, American historian
 Louis Prima Jr. "Crown Prince" of swing, singer, songwriter, trumpet player and leader of his band, The Witnesses (Class of 1983)
 Rory Reid, Clark County commissioner
 Ron Riley, former professional basketball player (Class of 1992)
 Sam Smith, former NBA player (Class of 1973)
 Willie Smith, former NBA player (Class of 1972)
 Ronnie Vannucci Jr., drummer for The Killers

Performing arts

Clark High School is home to a number of performing groups, including the orchestra, band, and choir.

There is a beginning orchestra for any student wishing to learn to play a classical string instrument, and intermediate and advanced orchestras for more experienced players. More proficient musicians may opt to audition for the chamber orchestra, which challenges students with a considerably advanced repertoire.

Once marching season ends the marching band divides into two bands for the winter and spring seasons: the symphonic band (for intermediate musicians) and the wind ensemble (for advanced musicians). A drumline performs during the winter season, and there is a jazz band which has performed at Disneyland and on KLVX's Inside Education.

The chorus consists of several different groups. These include: All-men, All-women, Jazz, Concert, Advanced, and Chamber choirs.

Clark's full orchestra (consisting of orchestra and band) performed at Carnegie Hall in New York in 2008, 2012, and 2019. In March 2015, Clark's chamber orchestra performed at an ASTA national competition at Abravanel Hall in Salt Lake City. They placed as national and grand champions.

Weekend programs
Las Vegas Gakuen (ラスベガス学園), a Japanese weekend supplementary school, is held every Saturday at Clark High School. It was founded in September 1995.

Gallery

References

High schools in Las Vegas
Clark County School District
Educational institutions established in 1965
School buildings completed in 1965
Public high schools in Nevada
Magnet schools in Nevada
1965 establishments in Nevada